Crime Cities is a video game for Microsoft Windows. Developed and published by Techland and EON Digital Entertainment in 2000-2001 (and later by Big City Games and Gathering of Developers), Crime Cities is an action game that incorporates some limited elements of auto racing.

Reception

The game received "average" reviews according to the review aggregation website Metacritic.

References

External links
 Official website
 

2000 video games
Video games developed in Poland
Windows games
Windows-only games
Independent Games Festival winners
Cyberpunk video games
Techland games
Multiplayer and single-player video games
Video games about police officers
Video games set on fictional planets
Eon Digital Entertainment games